HEP is a major shopping mall and entertainment center in the Umeda commercial district of Kita-ku, Osaka, Japan. It is a shopping mall consisting of a HEP Five and HEP Navio.

HEP stands for "Hankyu Entertainment Park". The building is operated by Hankyu Hanshin Holdings's real estate investment trust (REIT) subsidiary Hankyu REIT and co-owned by Hankyu REIT (45%) and Hankyu Realty Co. (55%).

HEP Five
HEP Five receives about 17 million visitors annually (2007), making it one of the most visited fashion boutique buildings in the Osaka urban region. The core customers at HEP Five are young people, mostly female, from high school age to their early twenties.

The building itself houses over 100 shops (mostly fashion retail shops catering to young consumers), with restaurants, an event hall, amusement facilities (such as Joypolis and the Ferris wheel), a hanging replica of 2 whales designed by Tatsuya Ishii.

Ferris wheel
The HEP Five building is easily located as it has a large red Ferris wheel with a diameter of 75 metres protruding from its roof (the highest point of the wheel is 106m above the ground, including the height of the building), which is accessible for a fee.

Building data

HEP Navio

See also
 List of shopping malls in Japan

References

External links

Official website 
Official website
Hep Hall 
Hankyu REIT

Tourist attractions in Osaka
Buildings and structures in Osaka
Shopping centres in Japan
Hankyu Hanshin Holdings
Kita-ku, Osaka
Umeda